Simon Burton was born in Yorkshire, England in 1973 and received a first class bachelor's degree at the University of Brighton in 1995, before completing his MA in 1997 at the Royal College of Art. Described by Lucian Freud in 1997 as, "the most promising young artist in Britain today," Burton received the Birtle prize for painting (1995), a travel award to ARCO studios in Lisbon, Portugal (1996), The John Minton Travel award (1996), The Jenny Hall Scholarship (1996) and worked in the U.S.A under the patronage of Robert and Susan Kasen-Summer (1997–98).

Burton's work is described as "figurative painting that treads a line between classical, abstraction and magic realism" being "heavily layered both physically and with art historical references".

Selected solo exhibitions 
 2013 – One year later, York College Gallery, York, England

 2012 – Between Cave and Gate, ARTARY Gallery, Stuttgart

 2011  –Nowhere Men, Arch 402 Gallery, London

 2010 – Black Swan, Blue Woman, Huddersfield Museum

 2007 – Under the Sign of Saturn Kookmin Gallery, Seoul

Selected group exhibitions 
 2017 – Towards Night, Towner Art Gallery, Eastbourne, UK

 2016 – Paper Cuts, Transition Gallery, London

 2016 – March, James Freeman Gallery, London

 2016 – Selected works from the Priseman Seabrook Collection, The Minories Art Gallery, Colchester, England

 2015 – Contemporary British Drawing, Xi'an Academy of Fine Arts, China

 2015 – Neiland's Choice, GX Gallery, London

 2014 – Opinion Makers 2, Curated by Lubomirov-Easton, Londonewcastle Project Space, London

 2014 – Enclosures, Elsewhere at the Lion and Lamb Gallery

 2014 – Some of My Colours at the Eagle Gallery

 2014 – About Face Swindon Museum and Art Gallery

 2011 – A Sort of Night to the Mind, ARTARY Gallery, Stuttgart

Selected collections 
 The Aldrich Collection, University of Brighton, England

 The Louis-Dreyfus Collection, USA

 Falmouth Art Gallery, England

 The Priseman Seabrook Collection, UK

 Swindon Museum and Art Gallery, England

 Royal College of Art, London

References

External links
 Simon Burton official website
 Contemporary British Painting

1973 births
Living people
Artists from Yorkshire
21st-century British painters
British male painters
English painters
21st-century British male artists